Chelakkode Punnathala  is a village in Malappuram district in the state of Kerala, India

Transportation

The Village connected to National Highway 66 (India), between Kottakkal and Valanchery.

See also

 Athavanad Grama Panchayat
 Puthanathani

References

External links 
 http://wikimapia.org/14130797/PUNNATHALA-CHELAKKODE

Villages in Malappuram district